The Higher Institute of Engineering is an educational institute located in the Culture & Science City campus in 6th of October City, Egypt.

History
The Higher Institute for Engineering, 6 October City (HIE) was founded on 18 October 1994. It was established by the Ministerial Decree No. 1484. The Supreme Council of Universities issued degree equivalency based on decree no. (49) on 4/6/2001.

Programmes
The Institute grants the Bachelor of Science (B.Sc.) degree in four engineering disciplines: Construction and Building Engineering (CBE); Information and Computer Engineering (ICE); Administrative Industrial Engineering (AIE); and Mecatronics Engineering (MTE).

Accreditation
The undergraduate degree programmes, which last for 5 years, are accredited by the Supreme Council of Universities in Egypt, and its educational curriculum is supervised and revised by the Egyptian Ministry of Higher Education. The institute is affiliated with the Development of 6 October City Society.

Credential summary
Bachelor's degree in engineering from a recognized university

Country: Egypt

Educational System: Credit Hours

Credential: Bachelor of Science (B.Sc.)

Awarded by: Higher Institute of Engineering - 6 October City

Admission requirements: General Secondary Education Certificate

Length of Program: Five years

External links

References

Universities in Egypt
6th of October (city)
Educational institutions established in 1994
1994 establishments in Egypt